Servivensa S.A. (legally Servicios Avensa Sociedad Anónima S.A.) was a low-cost airline based in Caracas, Venezuela that operated scheduled domestic and international flights.

History
Servivensa was established by Avensa in 1989 to counteract the unionized workforce demands of Avensa's employees. By the mid-1990's it had grown to become larger than its parent company, and Servivensa crews of contract workers began operating Avensa aircraft. However, Venezuela's macroeconomic problems, especially its currency exchange restrictions, caused the airline to have trouble procuring spare parts and led to widespread grounding of its aircraft.

For a short time in 1999, the airline had an alliance with Aeroperú that operated codeshare flights between Caracas and Lima.

By 2001, Servivensa and Avensa were close to bankruptcy and were being sued by BP for over $1 million in unpaid fuel bills. Servivensa operations were officially ceased on May 1, 2003, when its parent company, Avensa announced that it was grounding its aircraft due to a drop in demand of air traffic.

Destinations

 Willemstad (Curaçao International Airport)

San José (Juan Santamaría International Airport)

Barranquilla (Ernesto Cortissoz International Airport)
Bogotá (El Dorado International Airport)

Quito (Old Mariscal Sucre International Airport)

Mexico City (Mexico City International Airport)

Lima (Jorge Chávez International Airport)

Miami (Miami International Airport)
New York City (John F. Kennedy International Airport)

Canaima (Canaima Airport)
Caracas (Simón Bolívar International Airport) Hub
Ciudad Bolívar (Tomás de Heres Airport)
Ciudad Guayana (Manuel Carlos Piar Guayana Airport)
El Vigía (Juan Pablo Pérez Alfonzo Airport)
Maturín (José Tadeo Monagas International Airport)
Maracaibo (La Chinita International Airport)
Mérida (Alberto Carnevalli Airport)
Porlamar (Santiago Mariño Caribbean International Airport)
Santa Elena de Uairén (Santa Elena de Uairén Airport)
Valencia (Arturo Michelena International Airport)

Fleet

Servivensa operated the following aircraft:

4 Beechcraft 90
3 Boeing 727-100
7 Boeing 727-200
2 Boeing 737-200
1 Boeing 757-200
2 Douglas DC-3C
5 Douglas C-47A Skytrain
8 McDonnell Douglas DC-9-31
3 McDonnell Douglas DC-9-32
3 McDonnell Douglas DC-9-51

Accidents and incidents
On December 17, 1994, Douglas C-47A (registered YV-761-C) crashed on approach to Cerro Aicha Airport, killing all nine people on board.
On October 2, 1998, Douglas DC-3C (registered YV-611C) crashed on approach to Canaima Airport. The aircraft had been on a local sightseeing flight to view the Angel Falls. One of the 25 people on board was killed.
In 2000, U.S. federal prosecutors indicted 18 individuals for a drug trafficking conspiracy centered around using Servivensa flight attendants to smuggle heroin into the United States, following a year-long investigation known as Operation Aeromoza.

See also
List of defunct airlines of Venezuela

References

External links
Servivensa Fleet

Avensa
Defunct airlines of Venezuela
Airlines established in 1990
Airlines disestablished in 2003
2003 disestablishments in Venezuela
Venezuelan companies established in 1990
Defunct low-cost airlines